Sill may refer to:

 Sill (dock), a weir at the low water mark retaining water within a dock
 Sill (geology), a subhorizontal sheet intrusion of molten or solidified magma
 Sill (geostatistics)
 Sill (river), a river in Austria
 Sill plate, a construction element
Window sill, a more specific construction element than above
Automotive sill, also known as a rocker panel; see Glossary of automotive design#R
 Fort Sill, a United States Army post near Lawton, Oklahoma
 Mount Sill, a California mountain
 A shoal near the mouth of a fjord, remnant of an extinct glacier’s terminal moraine

People

Sill
 Anna Peck Sill (1816-1889), American educator
 Edward Rowland Sill (1841–1887), American poet and educator

 George G. Sill (1829–1907), American politician from Connecticut
 Joel Sill (born 1946), American music producer
 John M. B. Sill (1831–1901), American diplomat
 Joshua W. Sill (1831–1862), American Civil War brigadier general
 Judee Sill (1944–1979), American singer and songwriter
 Lester Sill (1918–1994), American record label executive
 Thomas Hale Sill (1783–1856), American politician from Pennsylvania
 Zach Sill (born 1988), Canadian ice hockey player

Sills
 Beverly Sills (1929–2007), American operatic soprano
 David Sills (judge) (1938–2011), American jurist
 David Sills (American football) (born 1996), American football player
 Douglas Sills (born 1960), American actor
 Eileen Sills (born 1962), British chief nurse and NHS national guardian
 Josh Sills (born 1998), American football player
 Kenneth C.M. Sills (1879–1954), American educator
 Milton Sills (1882–1930), American stage and film actor
 Paul Sills (1927–2008), American director and improvisation teacher
 Saskia Sills (born 1996), British windsurfer and sailor
 Steven Sills, American screenwriter and film producer
 Tim Sills (born 1979), English footballer

See also 
 Cill (disambiguation)
 Still (disambiguation)